Ilitch Holdings, Inc. is an American holding company established in 1999 to provide all companies owned by Mike and Marian Ilitch with professional and technical services. Its privately held businesses include Little Caesars Pizza, the National Hockey League (NHL) Detroit Red Wings, the Major League Baseball (MLB) Detroit Tigers, Olympia Entertainment, Olympia Development, Olympia Parking, Blue Line Foodservice Distribution, Champion Foods, 313 Presents, the Little Caesars Pizza Kit Fundraising Program, Hockeytown Cafe, and a variety of venues within these entities. Ilitch Holdings subsidiaries manage Detroit's Fox Theatre, City Theatre, Comerica Park, Pine Knob Music Theatre, Michigan Lottery Amphitheater, Meadow Brook Amphitheater, and Little Caesars Arena, which replaced the Joe Louis Arena after closing in July 2017.

Ilitch Holdings, Inc. is headquartered in the Fox Theatre Building in Detroit, Michigan.

The family has also established Ilitch Charities which, among other things, awards annually the "Little Caesars" AAA Hockey Scholarships.

Christopher Ilitch, one of Mike & Marian Ilitch's seven children, is CEO and President of Ilitch Holdings and Chairman of Ilitch Charities. Marian Ilitch serves as the chairman.

Background
Mike and Marian Ilitch started Little Caesars in 1959. A complementary business, Blue Line Foodservice, was soon started to supply ingredients and other products to the growing restaurant chain.

In 1982, Ilitch entered into sports with the purchase of the struggling Red Wings. Ilitch, executing his long-term Detroit business conglomerate plan, also purchased Olympia Stadium Corporation that year. Olympia Stadium operated the Joe Louis and Cobo arenas.

The couple purchased and restored the downtown Fox Theatre in 1987. In 1988, they fielded an indoor football team, Detroit Drive, in the Arena Football League. In 1992, Mike purchased the Detroit Tigers. Purchasing the Tigers led him to sell the Drive in February 1994 given the leagues' overlapping schedules.

In 1996, the Ilitch family purchased the Birmingham movie theater in Birmingham, Michigan. The theater was then renovated into an eight-screen theater.

History
Ilitch Holdings was formed in 1999 to manage their various holdings. It formed Uptown Entertainment to own its Birmingham 8 and Palladium 12 theaters.

Until 2004, Christopher and Denise Ilitch, children of Mike and Marian, were co-presidents of Ilitch Holdings. At that time, Denise grew estranged from both her brother and parents and resigned from the position.

On July 1, 2015, Uptown Entertainment sold the Birmingham 8 movie theater to Birmingham Theatre, LLC. Chris Ilitch, then president and CEO of Ilitch Holdings, was designated as successor to his parents' positions, chair and vice chair, in running the companies. At the time Mike was running the sports teams, while Marian was in charge of the casino. Marian owned the casino due to MLB regulations that bar team owners from owning gambling establishments. After the death of Mike in March 2017, Chris took over management of the sports teams per the established succession plan.

Controversy
Ilitch Holdings has been criticised for leaving many properties in Detroit untenanted, allowing them to decay, and for demolishing historic buildings and leaving lots empty, or only using the lots as car parking, rather than developing them.

Subsidiaries
 Blue Line Foodservice, restaurant supply distribution
 Champion Foods, manufacture frozen pizza, breadsticks, calzone and cookie dough kits for private label and store brands
 Detroit Tigers (1992) MLB team
 Detroit Red Wings (1982) NHL team 
 Little Caesars Enterprise, Inc. (1959) pizza restaurant
  Little Caesars Pizza Kit Fundraising Program, fundraising business through assisting group sell pizza kits
 Olympia Development: The real estate arm which built the new Little Caesars Arena
 Olympia Entertainment (1982) formerly Olympia Stadium Corporation, manages multiple venues in sports and entertainment plus restaurants.
 Fox Theatre
City Theatre
Sound Board at MotorCity Casino Hotel
Comerica Park
Hockeytown Cafe
Little Caesars Arena
Ocean Casino Resort, 50% ownership
MotorCity Casino Hotel

References

External links
 
 Ilitch Companies

1999 establishments in Michigan
Companies based in Detroit
Conglomerate companies of the United States
Holding companies established in 1999
Sports holding companies of the United States
Ilitch family
Little Caesars